Craig Bird (born 21 January 1989) is a former professional Australian rules footballer who played for the Sydney Swans and Essendon Football Club in the Australian Football League (AFL).

He was drafted to the Swans with the 59th pick in the 2007 AFL draft after previously being part of the NSW AFL scholarship program. He was recruited from Nelson Bay and made his debut in round one of 2008 season, wearing the number 14 guernsey, previously worn by club legends Paul Kelly and Bob Skilton.  At the end of the 2008 season he was named as the Sydney Swans Rising Star of 2008 tied with Kieren Jack.

His 2010 season was delayed due to a stress fracture of the toe.

Bird enjoyed his best year at the Swans in 2011, managing to play 22 out of 24 games for the season. Bird was given a tagging role for much of the year and played the role exceptionally well for the most part. He played on some of the best midfielders in the league over the course of the season. However his best performance of the year came against the Western Bulldogs in round 18 when he kicked 4 goals as a defensive forward having been given the job of limiting the influence of dangerous rebounding defender, Rob Murphy.

Bird continued his consistent run of form in 2012 as he played on the competition's best midfielders and running defenders. Bird took his place in the Swans' 22 for the 2012 AFL Grand Final victory and went on to finish 9th in the 2012 Bob Skilton Medal, the highest placing of his career to date. After the 2012 AFL Premiership, Craig Bird has been regularly referred to in popular culture by the nicknames "Premiership Bird" and "PB", owing to his significant contribution during the Sydney Swans Premiership victory.

By 2015, however he had lost a regular spot in the side, as talent such as Tom Mitchell and Jake Lloyd cemented their spots. This left Bird struggling for opportunities.

In October 2015, Bird was traded to the Essendon Football Club.

At the conclusion of the 2017 season, he was delisted by Essendon.

Statistics
 Statistics are correct to the end of round 5, 2015

|- style="background-color: #EAEAEA"
! scope="row" style="text-align:center" | 2008
|style="text-align:center;"|
| 14 || 21 || 8 || 3 || 144 || 144 || 288 || 62 || 47 || 0.4 || 0.1 || 6.9 || 6.9 || 13.7 || 3.0 || 2.2
|- 
! scope="row" style="text-align:center" | 2009
|style="text-align:center;"|
| 14 || 15 || 5 || 3 || 108 || 130 || 238 || 41 || 48 || 0.3 || 0.2 || 7.2 || 8.7 || 15.9 || 2.7 || 3.2
|- style="background:#eaeaea;"
! scope="row" style="text-align:center" | 2010
|style="text-align:center;"|
| 14 || 4 || 1 || 0 || 35 || 34 || 69 || 14 || 11 || 0.3 || 0.0 || 8.8 || 8.5 || 17.3 || 3.5 || 2.8
|- 
! scope="row" style="text-align:center" | 2011
|style="text-align:center;"|
| 14 || 22 || 11 || 9 || 184 || 170 || 354 || 43 || 113 || 0.5 || 0.4 || 8.4 || 7.7 || 16.1 || 2.0 || 5.1
|- style="background:#eaeaea;"
! scope="row" style="text-align:center" | 2012
|style="text-align:center;"|
| 14 || 25 || 12 || 12 || 220 || 207 || 427 || 69 || 105 || 0.5 || 0.5 || 8.8 || 8.3 || 17.1 || 2.8 || 4.2
|- 
! scope="row" style="text-align:center" | 2013
|style="text-align:center;"|
| 14 || 23 || 10 || 5 || 269 || 152 || 421 || 53 || 84 || 0.4 || 0.2 || 11.7 || 6.6 || 18.3 || 2.3 || 3.7
|- style="background:#eaeaea;"
! scope="row" style="text-align:center" | 2014
|style="text-align:center;"|
| 14 || 21 || 6 || 5 || 206 || 209 || 415 || 58 || 105 || 0.3 || 0.2 || 9.8 || 10.0 || 19.8 || 2.8 || 5.0
|- 
! scope="row" style="text-align:center" | 2015
|style="text-align:center;"|
| 14 || 5 || 3 || 1 || 48 || 49 || 97 || 15 || 19 || 0.6 || 0.2 || 9.6 || 9.8 || 19.4 || 3.0 || 3.8
|- class="sortbottom"
! colspan=3| Career
! 136
! 56
! 38
! 1214
! 1095
! 2309
! 355
! 532
! 0.4
! 0.3
! 8.9
! 8.1
! 17.0
! 2.6
! 3.9
|}

References

External links

Living people
Essendon Football Club players
Sydney Swans players
Sydney Swans Premiership players
1989 births
Australian rules footballers from New South Wales
NSW/ACT Rams players
One-time VFL/AFL Premiership players